Adam Marian Tomasz Pius Leon duke Korybut Woroniecki, religious name Jacek (December 21, 1878 in Lublin – May 18, 1949 in Kraków) was a Polish Servant of God.

He was a priest and member of the Dominican Order, theologian, teacher, professor of ethics and scholastic philosopher. He was also the rector of the Katolicki Uniwersytet Lubelski (the Catholic University of Lublin) from 1922 to 1924, a member of Polska Akademia Umiejętności (the Polish Academy of Learning), professor of the Angelicum and the founder of Zgromadzenie Sióstr Dominikanek Misjonarek Jezusa i Maryi (the Congregation of Sisters Dominicans Missionaries of Jesus and Mary).

1878 births
1949 deaths
Members of the Dominican Order
Polish Roman Catholic theologians
20th-century Polish philosophers
Polish Servants of God
Academic staff of the John Paul II Catholic University of Lublin